Basseri dialect (Persian: گویش باصری) is a Persian dialect spoken in Fars province by the Basseri people. It is part of the Southwestern Iranian branch of the Indo-Iranian group of Indo-European languages. Basseri dialect consists of many exclusive Persian words with Old and Middle Persian roots and less Arabic Loanwords, which is a consequence of living in the mountains, nomadism and less connection with urban Persians.

Phonology

Vowels 
Basseri dialect has 6 vowels including /æ/ , /ɒ/ , /o/ , /e/ , /i/ , and /u:/; and also 4 diphthongs including  /æi/ , /ey/ ,/ow/ , and /oy/.

Consonants 
Basseri Persian has 21 consonants, in contrast with Iranian Persian with 23 consonants.

Distribution 
Basseri dialect is spoken among the Basseries in central Fars Province. Counties like Abadeh, Eqlid, Pasargad, Jahrom, Marvdasht, Shiraz, Khorrambid, Larestan, and Sarvestan are among the traditional living range of the Basseri.

Similarities with English 
Some words in Basseri dialect are similar to English words.

See also 
 Dialects and varieties of Persian language

References

External links
 
 
 www.baserionline.ir
 Basseri proverbs

 
Languages of Iran
Persian dialects and varieties